Razhukhrielie Kevichüsa Meru (21 October 1941 – 20 August 2022) was an Indian bureaucrat and musician from Nagaland. He served the Government of Nagaland as the administrative head of many significant departments in the state until his retirement in 2001.

Early life 
Razhukhrielie Kevichüsa Meru was born on 21 October 1941 in Tezpur, Assam.

Razhukhrielie's father Kevichüsa Angami, was Angami Naga from Khonoma and his mother Germanthangi was of Mizo descent from present-day Mizoram.

Career 
Kevichüsa was trained as an agriculture engineer and was later inducted into the Indian Administrative Service (IAS) and also served as the Deputy Commissioner of Kohima District.

He served the Government of Nagaland in various posts such as the Head of Department (HoD) of Agriculture, Art & Culture, Health & Family Welfare and Works & Housing.

He retired from service in 2001. Following his retirement, he served as Chairman of the Nagaland Public Service Commission (NPSC).

Music 
Kevichüsa was trained as a classical violin performer and has composed numerous songs, both gospel and secular. A music album entitled Songs of R. Kevichusa: The Tenyidie Collection was released 17 November 2019.

Personal life

Family 
Kevichüsa was married to Ethel. She is of Lotha Naga descent. Together the couple had six children and six grandsons.

Death 
Kevichüsa passed away at 10:23 Indian Standard Time (UTC+05:30), at Dimapur's Zion Hospital on 20 August 2022, aged 80.

References 

Naga people
1941 births
2022 deaths
People from Kohima
People from Dimapur